The Polish basketball league system, or Polish basketball league pyramid is a series of interconnected competitions for professional and amateur basketball clubs in Poland. The system has a hierarchical format with a promotion and relegation system between competitions at different levels.

Men

The tier levels
For the 2020–21 season, the Polish men's basketball league system is as follows:

Women

The tier levels
For the 2020–21 season, the Polish women's basketball league system is as follows:

See also
League system
European professional club basketball system
French basketball league system
German basketball league system
Greek basketball league system
Hungarian basketball league system
Italian basketball league system
Russian basketball league system
Serbian basketball league system
Spanish basketball league system
Turkish basketball league system
South American professional club basketball system

External links
Polish league on Eurobasket 
Polish Basketball Association 

 
Basketball league systems